The Weight of Flight is the second official release from Phosphorescent. The EP was released via Athens-based label Warm Records, on June 8, 2004.

Track listing
 "Toes Out to Sea"
 "All of It, All"
 "When We Fall"
 "My Heroes Have Always Been Cowboys"
 "Not Right, You Know"
 "Mrs. Juliette Low"

References

2004 EPs
Phosphorescent (band) albums